John O'Hara House is a historic home located in Pottsville, Pennsylvania. It was built about 1870, and is a three-story, three bay wide stone building in the Italianate style. The front elevation features a three-story central tower. The house was built by David Yuengling of the Yuengling brewery family. It was the childhood home of author John O'Hara (1905–1970), whose father purchased the house in 1916 and remained there until 1940.

It was added to the National Register of Historic Places in 1978.

References

Houses completed in 1870
Houses in Schuylkill County, Pennsylvania
Houses on the National Register of Historic Places in Pennsylvania
Italianate architecture in Pennsylvania
National Register of Historic Places in Schuylkill County, Pennsylvania